Glaronisi ("seagull island", also known as Petalidi ("limpet"), is an islet off the northwest coast of the island of Dia, north of the Greek island of Crete. Glaronisi is administered from Gouves in Heraklion regional unit.

See also
List of islands of Greece

References

Landforms of Heraklion (regional unit)
Uninhabited islands of Crete
Islands of Greece